Colours is the third studio album by Spanish duo Baccara, first released on label RCA-Victor in Germany in 1979. It contains European single releases "Body Talk"/"By 1999" and "Ay Ay Sailor".

The rights to the RCA-Victor back catalogue are currently held by Sony BMG Music Entertainment - the original Colours album in its entirety remains unreleased on compact disc. However, all tracks from the album do appear on the German 30th anniversary box set.

"Body Talk"/"By 1999" was released as a 'Special limited edition' 12' single featuring remixed extended versions of both tracks released in Germany. "Ay, Ay Sailor" The first Single issued from the album charted at a 39 in the German charts .

The album cover displays the girls with elaborate painted faces and the back cover features photographs of the girls having their faces painted.

Track listing

Side A
 "Ay, Ay Sailor"  (Rolf Dostal - Frank Soja) - 3:52
 "For You"  (Rolf Dostal - Frank Soja) - 3:45
 "One, Two, Three, That's Life"  (Rolf Dostal - Frank Soja) - 3:41
 "I'll Learn to Fly Tonight"  (Rolf Soja - Peter Zentner) - 3:29
 "Boomerang"  (Rolf Soja - Peter Zentner) - 3:02

Side B
 "Body-Talk"  (Frank Dostal - Rolf Soja) - 4:40
 "Roses in the Snow"  (Rolf Soja - Peter Zentner) - 3:55
 "By 1999 (By Nineteen-Ninety-Nine)"  (Frank Dostal - Rolf Soja) - 3:38
 "Groovy Kinda Lovin'"  (Jürgen Schröder - Peter Zentner) - 3:02
 "Sing Our Love a Lullaby"  (Frank Dostal - Rolf Soja) - 3:25

Personnel
 Mayte Mateos - vocals
 María Mendiola - vocals

Production
 Produced and arranged by Rolf Soja.

Baccara albums
1979 albums
RCA Records albums